The following lists events that happened during 1949 in Poland.

Incumbents

Members of the government
 President - Bolesław Bierut
 Prime Minister - Józef Cyrankiewicz

Events
The Three-Year Plan ends.

September
2 September - The Society of Fighters for Freedom and Democracy is established.

Births
 15 April – Aleksandra Ziółkowska-Boehm, writer
 4 May – Stanisław Stolarczyk, journalist, reporter, writer
 18 June
Jarosław Kaczyński, Prime Minister of Poland
Lech Kaczyński, Prime Minister of Poland (died 2010)
 3 October 1949 – Svika Pick, Israeli pop singer, songwriter, composer, and television personality (died 2022)

Deaths
5 June - Emilia Malessa,  Freedom and Independence member, committed suicide in prison (born 1907)
24 July - Konstanty Skirmunt, Minister of Foreign Affairs 1921-1922 (born 1866)
27 December - Antoni Ponikowski, politician (born 1878)

References 

 
Poland
Poland
Years of the 20th century in Poland